This Wild Willing is the fourth studio album by Irish singer-songwriter Glen Hansard. It was released on 12 April 2019, under Anti-.

Critical reception
This Wild Willing was met with "generally favourable" reviews from critics. At Metacritic, which assigns a weighted average rating out of 100 to reviews from mainstream publications, this release received an average score of 76, based on 8 reviews. Aggregator Album of the Year gave the release a 78 out of 100 based on a critical consensus of 6 reviews.

Track listing

Personnel

Musicians
 Glen Hansard – lead vocals, producer
 Breanndán Ó Beaglaoich – accordion
 Joseph Doyle – bass
 Paula Hughes – cello
 Earl Harvin – drums
 Rosie MacKenzie
 Justin Carroll – keyboard
 Rob Bochnik – guitar
 Ruth O'Mahony Brady – piano
 Dunk Murphy – keyboard
 Katie O'Connor – violin
 Nadia Genet – backing vocals
 Maire Saaritsa – backing vocals
 Markéta Irglová – backing vocals
 Mãni Khoshravesh – backing vocals
 Pouyã Khoshravesh – backing vocals
 Nadia Genet – backing vocals
 Una O'Kane – violin
 Michael Buckley – saxophone
 Curtis Fowlkes – trombone
 David Smith – trumpet
 Javier Mas – classical guitar

Production
 Bob Ludwig – mastering
 Dave Odlum – mixing, producer, guitar

Charts

References

External links

2019 albums
Glen Hansard albums
Anti- (record label) albums